Zdeněk Kudrna (1946-1982), Czechoslovak speedway rider
Zdeněk Kudrna (1974), Czech ice hockey player